Tumukhong is a small village in Imphal East district in Indian state of Manipur It is located 24 km towards East from District headquarters Porompat and also 24 km from State capital Imphal.

Demographics 
Tumukhong has population about 1000 people according to census 2011. It is in the border of the Imphal East District, ukhrul in the eat  sadhar hills district in the west  Thoubal is south  this village.

References

Villages in Imphal East district